Hendon Greyhound Stadium was a greyhound racing stadium in Hendon, London.

Origins
The area of Hendon famously has special links to greyhound racing based on the fact that on the 6 March 1876 the first attempt at mechanical racing took place on a 400 yards long straight course near the Welsh Harp in the London suburb of Hendon. This was fourteen years before the patent for circular tracks had been taken out and fifty years before the first oval race was held at Belle Vue Stadium. During 1934 an attempt to start racing greyhounds around the Hendon Cricket ground failed after the owners of the ground, the Wearmouth Coal Company Ltd rejected the proposal.

One year later in 1935 a stadium had been constructed on spare land between the River Brent and the relatively new North Circular Road directly east of the main London, Midland and Scottish railway line.

Opening
The opening meeting was on 5 March 1935 with the stadium consisting of one main grandstand building along the home straight and a capacity of 6,000 spectators. The hare system used was an 'Outside Sumner' with a track circumference of 398 yards grass course with sharp bends.

History

Owned by Hendon Stadium Ltd the totalisator turnover figures peaked at £2 million. Main events included the Calcutta Cup and Welsh Harp
Cup.

After World War II Hendon and Hackney Wick Stadium merged to become the Hackney and Hendon Greyhounds Ltd company. The resident kennels featured six ranges with each able to house up to fifty greyhounds, paddocks sat next to each range with cooking facilities and a veterinary surgeon on site. The kennel fees were 17s 6d for each greyhound.

In the 1950s Mr D G Lewis became the Racing Manager followed by Fred Whitehead becoming the Director of Racing for Hendon and Hackney. Lewis would switch to sister track Hackney with Michael Marks brought in to replace him. The pair would once again swap places in the 1960s sixties with Lewis returning to Hendon.

During the 1960s racing continued on two evenings per week (Monday and Saturday at 7.45pm) and amenities included a restaurant and five additional buffet and licensed bars with principal events called the North Circular Marathon, Burletta Stakes and L.V. Chairman's Cup. A major event arrived in 1969 after Hendon was awarded the Guineas following the closure of Park Royal Stadium. With the end of Park Royal and New Cross Stadium their Bookmakers Afternoon Greyhound Service (BAGS) fixtures were replaced by Hendon and Hackney.

Attached trainers included Annetts, Reg Bosley, Colebrooke, Paddy Gordon, Hedley and Lionel Maxen, the same group of trainers that supplied the Hackney greyhounds.

Closure
In 1970 businessman George Walker brother of boxing champion Billy Walker arranged a reverse takeover of Hackney and Hendon Greyhounds Stadium Ltd. This meant his private company bought a public company and the new merger resulted in a new company called Brent Walker. This resulted in the end for the Hendon Greyhound Stadium because it was sold to make way for the UK's first stand-alone shopping centre on the site that would soon be known as the Brent Cross shopping centre.

The stadium finally closed on 30 June 1972, it was demolished with some of the land forming the new links to the M1 motorway and the rest being used as parking spaces for the shopping centre.

Competitions

Guineas

Track records

References

Defunct greyhound racing venues in the United Kingdom
Defunct greyhound racing venues in London
Greyhound racing in London
1935 establishments in England
1972 disestablishments in England
Demolished sports venues in the United Kingdom
Sports venues completed in 1935
Sports venues demolished in 1972